The Fourth Arm is a British television series produced by the BBC in 1979.

The twelve-part serial dealt with secret agents parachuted into occupied Europe during the Second World War, following their progress through initial recruitment and training, and finally their first mission in enemy territory.

The Fourth Arm was created and produced by Gerard Glaister, who had previously been at the helm of other World War II dramas such as Colditz and Secret Army. The serial starred former Secret Army cast member Paul Shelley as Major Hugh Gallagher, essentially a reprise of his Secret Army character, Major Nick Bradley, in all but name.

External links
 

BBC television dramas
World War II television drama series
1979 British television series debuts
1979 British television series endings
1970s British drama television series
English-language television shows